Cigaritis Nilus, the Saharan Silverline, is a butterfly in the family Lycaenidae. It is found in Senegal, the Gambia, Guinea, Mali, Burkina Faso, Ghana, northern and eastern Nigeria, Niger, Chad, Cameroon, southern Sudan, Uganda, and northern Kenya. The habitat consists of sub-deserts and deserts, the Sahel, Sudan savanna, and Guinea savanna.

References

Butterflies described in 1865
Cigaritis
Butterflies of Africa
Taxa named by William Chapman Hewitson